Anatoly Smirnov is the name of:
Anatoly Smirnov (diplomat), Russian diplomat and ambassador; see List of diplomatic missions of Russia
Anatoly Smirnov (swimmer) (born 1958), Soviet Olympic swimmer
Anatoly Filippovich Smirnov (1909–1986), Soviet scientist
Anatoly Mikhailovich Smirnov (born 1935), Russian scientist

See also
 Smirnov (surname)
 Smirnoff (surname)